Hartburn, also known as Hartburn Village, is a south west Stockton area in the borough of Stockton-on-Tees, County Durham, England. The area was originally called East Hartburn to differentiate it with West Hartburn near Middleton St George.

History

In 1183, William de Hertburne (also written as William de Hertbourne) exchanged his land in what is now Hartburn for land in Washington, thereby adopting a new title: William de Wessyngton. This occasion is commemorated by a plaque outside the church of All Saints in the village, which was erected at the 800th anniversary (2 April 1983). A later descendant of William de Wessyngton was George Washington, the first President of the United States of America.

Just outside the centre of the area is the Elmwood community centre, Elmwood was the first of Hartburn’s large detached properties, built in 1873. Originally the home of Mr Lewis Dodshon, owner of one of the largest wholesale grocers in the area, son of John Dodshon, whose memorial is in the centre of Stockton. In the 1880s, it was the home of the Mountjoy Pearse family, who employed thousands in shipbuilding yards on the Tees and an iron company in Hartlepool.

In June 1890 Sir Robert Ropner offered Hartburn Fields as a public park. On 4 October 1893, Ropner Park was officially opened. Ropner also owned nearby Preston Hall, the land also became a public park called Preston Park.

In June 1897, a large stone was erected outside All Saints' church to commemorate the 60th year of the reign of Queen Victoria. All Saints' church had originally been the village school, and was eventually altered to include pews and chancel steps etc., although these no longer exist.

The village was founded centuries ago with its surrounding area been developed with mostly semi-detached housing from the 1930s onwards. It is north of the A66 road. There is a large grassed open space section stretching from Birkdale Road, parallel with Marrick Road and Grinton Road, towards Ropner Park.

Education
The area contains a single school in Hartburn Primary School, located on Adelaide Grove.

Transport
Three bus services run through Hartburn: the 588/589 run by Compass Royston and the 87 by Tees Valley Stagecarriage. Services through the village ceased with the removal of the 98/99 service, and subsequent re-routing of the 588 past Harper Parade. However, they have restarted with the start of Tees Valley's 87, which loops the estate.

References

External links 

Areas of Stockton-on-Tees